The Constantinian dynasty is an informal name for the ruling family of the Roman Empire from Constantius Chlorus (died 306) to the death of Julian in 363. It is named after its most famous member, Constantine the Great, who became the sole ruler of the empire in 324. The dynasty is also called Neo-Flavian because every Constantinian emperor bore the name Flavius, similarly to the rulers of the first Flavian dynasty in the 1st century.

Stemmata
In italics the augusti and the augustae.

 Constantius I
 From relationship between Constantius I and Helena
 Constantine I
 From marriage between Constantine I and Minervina
 Crispus
 From marriage between Constantine I and Fausta
 Constantina, wife of Hannibalianus and Constantius Gallus
 Constantine II
 Constantius II
No offspring from marriage between Constantius II and his first wife, daughter of Julius Constantius
No offspring from marriage between Constantius II and Eusebia
From marriage between Constantius II and Faustina
Flavia Maxima Constantia, wife of Gratian
 Constans I
 Helena, wife of Julian
 From marriage between Constantius Chlorus and Theodora
Flavius Dalmatius
 From marriage between Flavius Dalmatius and unknown wife
 Flavius Dalmatius
 Hannibalianus, husband of Constantina
Julius Constantius
 From marriage between Julius Constantius and Galla
 son, died in the purges of 337
 daughter, first wife of Constantius II
 Constantius Gallus
 No offspring from marriage between Gallus and Constantina
 From marriage between Julius Constantius and Basilina
 Julian
 No offspring from marriage between Julian and Helena, daughter of Constantine I
 Hannibalianus (must have died before the imperial purges that occurred in 337 because he is not listed among its victims);
Anastasia;
 Flavia Julia Constantia, wife of Licinius
 Valerius Licinianus Licinius
Eutropia
Julius Nepotianus

Family tree

Emperors are shown with a rounded-corner border with their dates as Augusti, names with a thicker border appear in both sections

1: Constantine's parents and half-siblings

2: Constantine's children

Relationship to other tetrarchs

Other rulers of the tetrarchy were related to the Constantinian dynasty:

Maximian: adoptive father and stepfather-in-law of Constantius Chlorus, father-in-law of Constantine, stepgrandfather-in-law of Licinius
Maxentius: adoptive brother and half-brother-in-law of Constantius Chlorus, brother-in-law of Constantine
Licinius: son-in-law of Constantius Chlorus, half-brother-in-law of Constantine

Notes

References
R. Scott Moore, "The Stemmata of the Neo-Flavian Emperors", DIR (1998)
R. Scott Moore, "The Stemmata of the Emperors of the Tetrarchy", DIR (1998)